Cortés is one of the 18 departments of Honduras. The department covers an area of 3,954 km² and, in 2015, had an estimated population of 1,612,762, making it the most populous in Honduras. The Merendón Mountains rise in western Cortés, but the department is mostly a tropical lowland, the Sula Valley, crossed by the Ulúa and Chamelecon rivers.

It was created in 1893 from parts of the departments of Santa Bárbara and Yoro. The departmental capital is San Pedro Sula. Main cities also include Choloma, La Lima, Villanueva, and the sea ports of Puerto Cortés and Omoa.  The Atlantic coast of the Department of Cortés is known for its many excellent beaches.

Cortés is the economic heartland of Honduras, as the Sula Valley is the country's main agricultural and industrial region. US banana companies arrived in the area in the late 19th century, and established vast plantations, as well as infrastructure to ship the fruit to the United States. San Pedro Sula attracted substantial numbers of European, Central American, and Palestinian and Lebanese immigrants.  Industry flourishes in the department, and Cortés today hosts most of the country's assembly plants, known as maquilas.

Municipalities

 Choloma
 La Lima
 Omoa
 Pimienta
 Potrerillos
 Puerto Cortés
 San Antonio de Cortés
 San Francisco de Yojoa
 San Manuel
 San Pedro Sula
 Santa Cruz de Yojoa
 Villanueva

References

 
Departments of Honduras
States and territories established in 1893